The Black Bag is a lost 1922 American silent mystery film directed by Stuart Paton and starring Herbert Rawlinson. It was produced and distributed by the Universal Film Manufacturing Company.

Plot
As described in a film magazine, wealthy Dorothy Calender (Valli) withdraws a string of pearls from her uncle's keeping to assist her brother with a debt. A detective is following her about and with the aid of others almost succeeds in getting his hands on the pearls. Billy Kirkwood (Rawlinson), who thinks Dorothy is a thief but wants to save her from her folly, secures the pearls from the escaping crooks and restores them to the young woman. Later it develops that the detective is dishonest and the whole gang is locked up, while Dorothy declares her love for the man who saved her property.

Cast
Herbert Rawlinson as Billy Kirkwood
Virginia Valli as Dorothy Calender
Bert Roach as Mulready
Clara Beyers as Mrs. Hallam
Charles King as Freddie Hallam
Herbert Fortier as Samuel Brentwick
Lew Short as Burgoyne
John B. O'Brien as Martin

References

External links

1922 films
American silent feature films
Lost American films
Films directed by Stuart Paton
Universal Pictures films
American black-and-white films
American mystery films
1922 mystery films
Films based on American novels
1922 lost films
1920s American films
Silent mystery films
1920s English-language films